The 65th Street station is a local station on the IND Queens Boulevard Line of the New York City Subway, located at the intersection of 65th Street and Broadway in Queens. It is served by the M train on weekdays, the R train at all times except nights, and the E and F trains at night. The station opened on August 19, 1933, as part of the Independent Subway System's Queens Boulevard Line.

History 
The Queens Boulevard Line was one of the first lines built by the city-owned Independent Subway System (IND), and stretches between the IND Eighth Avenue Line in Manhattan and 179th Street and Hillside Avenue in Jamaica, Queens. The Queens Boulevard Line was in part financed by a Public Works Administration (PWA) loan and grant of $25 million. One of the proposed stations would have been located at 65th Street.

Station layout 

There are four tracks and two side platforms; the two center express tracks are used by the E and F trains at all times except late nights. The R stops here at all times but late nights, the M stops here weekdays, and the E and F stop here during late nights.

Signs to the northbound platform are on the wall instead of hanging over the staircase. The reason for this was because the original 1933 IND tile sign read "Jamaica and Rockaway", anticipating construction of a never-built system expansion. These signs remained uncovered as late as 2001. The 1933 Manhattan-bound tile signs remain intact.

Both platforms are column-less, and their platform walls have a Puce trim line with a black border, with a number of replacement tiles in different shades of violet and purple having been placed during repairs. There are also mosaic name tablets reading "65TH ST." in white sans-serif lettering on a black background and Puce border. Small tile captions reading "65TH ST" in white lettering on black run below the trim line, and directional signs in the same style are present below some of the name tablets.

West of this station, the express tracks become depressed and break from the local tracks. The express tracks run underneath Northern Boulevard, while the local tracks continue under Broadway and then turn to Steinway Street before meeting up with the express trains underneath Northern and Steinway. The line was built in this fashion because Broadway and Steinway Street are too narrow to align four tracks side by side underneath them.

Exits
The full-time mezzanine is at the eastern end has three staircases to each platform and two staircases to the street, one to either eastern corner of Broadway and 65th Street. Both sides had fare controls and former booths at platform levels at the far western end, at the opposite end of the current mezzanine. They have since been sealed. Signs at the northeast exit as well as the Manhattan-bound platforms are for Rowan Street, the former name of 65th Street.

References

External links 

 
 Station Reporter — R Train
 Station Reporter — M Train
 The Subway Nut — 65th Street Pictures 
 65th Street entrance from Google Maps Street View
 Platforms from Google Maps Street View

IND Queens Boulevard Line stations
1933 establishments in New York City
New York City Subway stations in Queens, New York
Railway stations in the United States opened in 1936
Woodside, Queens
1936 establishments in New York City